Sergey Kravkov may refer to

Sergey Kravkov (explorer) (1894–1942), Soviet hydrographer and Arctic explorer
Sergey Kravkov (agronomist) (1873–1938), Russian soil scientist and agricultural chemist
Sergey Kravkov (psychologist) (1893–1951), Russian psychologist and psychophysiologist